O Doutrinador (English: The Awakener) is a Brazilian comic book series created by Luciano Cunha. The main character, "Doutrinador" is a vigilante who aims to kill corrupt politicians who are harming Brazilian society.

Publication history 
The comics were first conceived by Luciano Cunha in 2008, but only in 2013 the project begun to be developed and publicized on social networks. The first independent publication sold out in 2014 and soon after, Luciano teamed up with musician and activist Marcelo Yuka to write a new story called Dark Web.

The English translation was published by Arkhaven Comics and is available as a free webcomic.

Plot 
O Doutrinador is a vigilante named Miguel, a highly trained federal agent who lives in a Brazil whose government has been hijacked by a gang of politicians and businessmen. A personal tragedy leads him to select endemic corruption as his greatest enemy. He begins to take revenge upon the political elite in the run up to Brazilian presidential elections, in a no-holds-barred crusade against corruption.

Publications

Adaptations

Films 
In 2018, O Doutrinador was released, directed by Gustavo Bonafé.

Series 
The television series O Doutrinador: A Série was released on September 1, 2019 on Space and complements the events of the original film.

References

Doutrinador
Doutrinador
Doutrinador
Doutrinador
Doutrinador
Doutrinador
Vigilante characters in comics